Clarkes is an unincorporated crossroads community in central Clackamas County, Oregon, United States.

References

Unincorporated communities in Clackamas County, Oregon
Unincorporated communities in Oregon